Xueshan, formerly known as  and by other names, is a mountain in the Heping District of Taichung, Taiwan. It is located in the Shei-Pa National Park and is visible in good weather from hills near Taiwan's capital Taipei.

Names
Xuěshān is the pinyin romanization of the Chinese name  meaning "Snow" or "Snowy Mountain". The same name was romanized as Hsüehshan  using the Wade-Giles system.

Its name was accordingly changed to Tsugitakayama(次高山), meaning "Next-" or "Second-Highest Mountain", in 1923.

History

Climbing Xueshan
Xueshan is a part of the Shei-Pa National Park and so climbers are required to apply for a park entry permit.  This can be done 7–30 days in advance. After that a police mountain entry permit must be applied for. This can be done at the police station in Wuling Farm on the spot.

There are two cabins on the trail. The first, Chika Cabin, is at the  mark. The second, 369 Cabin, is at the  mark. Both cabins are spartan, and contain bunker style beds. Hikers must bring their own sleeping and cooking gear.

The peak is at the  mark.

Gallery

See also
 100 Peaks of Taiwan
 List of mountains in Taiwan
 List of Ultras of Tibet, East Asia and neighbouring areas
 Shei-Pa National Park
 Taroko National Park
 Xueshan Range
 Hsuehshan Tunnel

References

Citations

Bibliography

 .
 

Landforms of Taichung
Mountains of Taiwan
Mountaineering in Taiwan